Limnonectes bannaensis (vernacular name: Banna large-headed frog) is a species of frogs in the family Dicroglossidae. It is found in southern China (southern and western Yunnan, southwestern and southeastern Guangxi, and western and central Guangdong), Laos, Thailand and Vietnam.

Description
Adult males in the type series measure  and adult females  in snout–vent length. In a larger series, maximum male and female sizes are respectively . Skin on the dorsum is smooth (wrinkled in Limnonectes kuhlii), with just few fine folds and a few small rounded tubercles scattered posteriorly. The dorsal colouration is brownish or gray brown, with black stripes on areas around the folds. The venter is mottled.

Habitat
The tadpoles develop in the streams.

References

bannaensis
Frogs of China
Amphibians of Laos
Amphibians of Vietnam
Amphibians described in 2007